Kari Mikael Ketonen (born 16 August 1971) is a Finnish actor. Born in Espoo, he portrayed the president of Russia Vladimir Putin in the sketch comedy television show Putous in 2014. He also played Putin in the film Iron Sky: The Coming Race.

Putin sketch 
Television show Putous sketch was shown on MTV3 on November 15, 2014. The president of Finland Sauli Niinistö (Joonas Nordman) and the prime minister of Finland Alexander Stubb (Antti Holma) are discussing about politics in advance of the president of Russia Vladimir Putin (Kari Ketonen). Svetlana Rönkkö (Jenni Kokander) is translating Putin.

Selected filmography

Film
The Renovation (2020)
Iron Sky: The Coming Race (2019)
Eine Insel namens Udo (2011)
Napapiirin Sankarit (2010)
Risto (2011)Sauna (2008)Pelikaanimies (2004)

TelevisionLuottomiesPutous (2014)Kimmo'' (since 2012)

References

External links

1971 births
Living people
21st-century Finnish male actors
Finnish male film actors
Finnish male television actors
People from Espoo